Perdida may refer to:

 Perdida (1916 film), a 1916 silent Brazilian film
 Perdida (2018 film), a 2018 Argentine-Spanish drama film
 Perdida (2019 film), a 2019 Mexican drama film
 Perdida (album), a music album by American rock band Stone Temple Pilots
 Perdida River, a river in central Brazil